Jennifer McCann (born 1 March 1960) is an Irish republican former politician in Northern Ireland, who was elected in 2007 to the Northern Ireland Assembly as a Sinn Féin member for Belfast West. She resigned from the Assembly in December 2016.

Early life
McCann was born in the Twinbrook area of Belfast, and was friends with Bobby Sands and his sister Bernadette. She joined the republican movement as a schoolgirl, becoming a member of Cumann na mBan then joining the Provisional Irish Republican Army aged 17. McCann was arrested aged 20, after shooting a Royal Ulster Constabulary police officer, and subsequently sentenced to 20 years' imprisonment.

Political career
McCann was released from prison after serving just over ten years of her sentence, and began working for Sinn Féin in the POW Department and Women's Department. She is active on a number of projects in her community, including the Sally Gardens Community Centre Committee, the Safer Neighbourhoods Project, the Colin Community Festival, and the Falls Community Council's Community Drugs Programme.

Personal life
McCann is married to former IRA prisoner Rab Kerr, with whom she has three children.

References

Sources
Bobby Sands was a great role model – he was never arrogant Sunday Tribune (archived), 12 November 2007
Northern Ireland Assembly West Belfast MLAs Stratagem NI

1960 births
Female members of the Northern Ireland Assembly
Irish republicans
Irish republicans imprisoned under Prevention of Terrorism Acts
Junior ministers of the Northern Ireland Assembly (since 1999)
Living people
Northern Ireland MLAs 2007–2011
Northern Ireland MLAs 2011–2016
Northern Ireland MLAs 2016–2017
Politicians from Belfast
Provisional Irish Republican Army members
Sinn Féin MLAs
21st-century women politicians from Northern Ireland
Cumann na mBan members